1965 in Indonesia was the year of significant change between the Old Order of Sukarno, and the transition to the New Order of Suharto.

It was also the year in which a large number of people were killed.

A number of 'labels' for the year and events have been created.  Sukarno called it the Year of Living Dangerously - as a consequence the phrase was used in a novel The Year of Living Dangerously (novel) and film - The Year of Living Dangerously (film).

Incumbents
 President: Sukarno

Births
 April 15 – Lilies Handayani, archer

References

 
Years of the 20th century in Indonesia